Alberto Alberani Samaritani (born 22 May 1947) is a retired Italian water polo goalkeeper. He competed at 1968, 1972, 1976, and 1980 Olympics and won a silver medal in 1976.

See also
 Italy men's Olympic water polo team records and statistics
 List of Olympic medalists in water polo (men)
 List of players who have appeared in multiple men's Olympic water polo tournaments
 List of men's Olympic water polo tournament goalkeepers
 List of world champions in men's water polo
 List of World Aquatics Championships medalists in water polo

References

External links
 
 

1947 births
Living people
Sportspeople from Florence
Italian male water polo players
Water polo goalkeepers
Water polo players at the 1968 Summer Olympics
Water polo players at the 1972 Summer Olympics
Water polo players at the 1976 Summer Olympics
Water polo players at the 1980 Summer Olympics
Olympic silver medalists for Italy in water polo
Medalists at the 1976 Summer Olympics
World Aquatics Championships medalists in water polo